Ronald George “Ron” Mountford (1927-1993) was an international speedway rider from England.

Speedway career 
Mountford was a leading rider in the 1950s and 1960s and reached the final of the Speedway World Championship in the 1962 Individual Speedway World Championship.

He rode in the top tier of British Speedway from 1950 to 1972, riding for Birmingham Brummies and Coventry Bees.

He was capped by England 25 times and Great Britain 4 times.

World final appearances

Individual World Championship
 1962 -  London, Wembley Stadium - 16th - 2pts
 1963 -  London, Wembley Stadium - Reserve - Did not ride

References 

1927 births
1993 deaths
British speedway riders
Coventry Bees riders
Birmingham Brummies riders